Crossed swords may refer to:

Arts and entertainment
 Crossed Swords (1954 film), an Italian film
 "Crossed Swords", an episode of the British sitcom Steptoe and Son
 "Crossed Swords", the pilot episode of the American sitcom Sanford and Son, based on the Steptoe and Son episode
 The Prince and the Pauper (1977 film), a British film released in the US as Crossed Swords
 Crossed Swords (video game), a 1990 arcade game by ADK

Other uses
 ⚔, a Unicode glyph (u+2694) for killed in action, part of the Miscellaneous Symbols Unicode block
 The Victory Arch monument in Baghdad, sometimes referred to as the Crossed Swords
 Meissen porcelein's mark, a logo designed to resemble crossed swords